Finchley Methodist Church is a Methodist church in Ballards Lane, North Finchley, London.

See also
East Finchley Methodist Church

References

External links

Methodist churches in London
Finchley